Muhammad Asif Jalali was an Afghan comedian TV presenter.

Early life 
Asif Jalali was born in 1957 in Kapisa province, but grew up in Logar province, Afghanistan. He spent most of his life in Kabul.
Asif Jalali graduated from Kabul Polytechnic University. He studied theater and cinema as an amateur and appeared for the first time in a program on the National Radio and Television of Afghanistan. He also starred in several films. During the Taliban regime, he recorded and marketed his comedy programs outside Afghanistan. After the fall of the Taliban government, he ran the Shabkhand program on TV One. He recently hosted Khandistan program a comedy show on Afghanistan TV.

Death 
Asif Jalali died of cardiac arrest on January 1, 2020.

References 

1957 births
2020 deaths
Afghan artists
People from Kapisa Province
Kabul Polytechnic University alumni